Henri Gouget was a French film actor. He appeared in more than sixty films during the silent era.

Selected filmography
 L'Enfant prodigue (1907)
 The Gaieties of the Squadron (1913)
 Jean la Poudre (1913)
 The System of Doctor Goudron (1913)
 Le Secret du Lone Star (1920)

References

Bibliography
 Waldman, Harry. Maurice Tourneur: The Life and Films. McFarland, 2001.

External links

Year of birth unknown
Year of death unknown
French male film actors
French male silent film actors
20th-century French male actors